Cut-off factor (AKA "cut-off length") is a factor  used to calculate the length of a hose cut to achieve the desired overall length of hose plus fittings. It is commonly seen in hydraulic hose and fitting specifications. The cut-off factor is specific to a particular hose fitting.

The formula used in calculating the optimum overall length is:

.

In this formula, C1 represents the cut-off factor of the first hose end and C2 represents the cut-off factor of the second hose end.

 

Hydraulics